John "Jobber" McGrath (1928 – 14 April 1980) was an Irish sportsperson.  He played hurling with his local club Rickardstown and with the Westmeath senior inter-county team from 1950 until 1965.  McGrath was later recognised as "one of the greatest players never to have won an All-Ireland medal".

Playing career

Club

McGrath played his club hurling with his local Rickardstown club and won his first senior county title in 1953.  McGrath added to his collection in 1959 and 1963 when he captured two more county championship medals. He finished his playing career with Lough Lene Gaels (who were an amalgamation between Collinstown, Fore, Glenidan and McGrath's club Rickardstown), winning a junior medal with the club in 1973.

Inter-county

McGrath first came to prominence on the inter-county scene with the Westmeath minor hurling team in the 1940s.  In 1950 McGrath made his debut for the Westmeath senior team, beginning a fifteen-year inter-county career.  During this era he enjoyed minimal success with the county as Westmeath were one of the minnows of the Leinster Championship.

Provincial

McGrath also lined out with Leinster in the inter-provincial hurling competition, and won his sole Railway Cup medal in 1956 as Leinster defeated Munster.

References

 Corry, Eoghan, The GAA Book of Lists (Hodder Headline Ireland, 2005).

Teams

1928 births
1980 deaths
Rickardstown hurlers
Lough Lene Gaels hurlers
Westmeath inter-county hurlers
Leinster inter-provincial hurlers